Qandi Sara (also Romanized as Qandī Sarā) is a village in Asalem Rural District, Asalem District, Talesh County, Gilan Province, Iran. At the 2006 census, its population was 94, in 27 families.

References 

Populated places in Talesh County